We Are Fearless is a studio album by contemporary worship band Fearless BND. It was released on February 24, 2017 by Fearless International.

Critical reception 

Rating the album four and half stars for Jesus Freak Hideout, Nicole Marie Vacca says, If there is one word to describe We Are Fearless, it is certainly "fun." The album kicks off with the bouncy, summery opener "Brighter," a track that is sure to get listeners' heads nodding, toes tapping, and fists pumping. The next five tracks maintain the momentum, featuring heavy bass beats, finger-snap samples, experimental electronic interludes, and lyrics encouraging listeners to "dance," "jump," "rise," and "lift," making these first six tracks ideal for a cardio workout playlist.

Track listing

References 

2017 albums
Fearless BND albums